Anjaan may refer to:
Anjaan (lyricist) (Lalji Pandey, 1929–1997), Indian Hindi lyricist
Sameer Anjaan (Shitala Pandey, born 1958), Indian Hindi lyricist, son of Anjaan
Anjaan (1941 film), a Bollywood film
Anjaan (2014 film), an Indian Tamil film
Anjaan (soundtrack)

See also
 
Anjan (disambiguation)
Anjaan Hai Koi, a 1969 Indian Hindi movie
Anjaan: Special Crimes Unit, an Indian paranormal investigative crime horror TV series
Anjaane, a 2005 Bollywood horror film